Rabah Ziad (born 12 December 1987) is an Algerian footballer who plays for AS Aïn M'lila in the Algerian Ligue Professionnelle 1.

References 

Living people
1987 births
Algerian footballers
Association football defenders
AS Aïn M'lila players
21st-century Algerian people